The EuroHockey Nations Championships are a European indoor field hockey competition organized by the European Hockey Federation (EHF). The tournament was started in 1974 for both men's competition and the women's competition.

In the men's competition, Germany is the most successful team, having won the tournament 12 times out of 13 between 1974 and 2008. For women, Germany is also the most successful team, having won all titles but one between 1974 and 2008. The only national team beside Germany to win the men's competition between 1974 and 2008 is Russia, having done so in 2008 by defeating Germany in the gold medal game. The only team beside Germany to win the women's competition between 1974 and 2008 is England, having done so in 1996 by defeating Germany in the gold medal game. The 2010 edition of the men's tournament is the first to not feature Germany in the top four.

Men's results

Championship I

Medal summary

Championship II

 Eurohockey Indoor Nations Trophy (1997 to 2010)
 Eurohockey Indoor Nations Championships II (2012 to 2016)

Championship III

 Eurohockey Indoor Nations Challenge I (2003 to 2010)
 Eurohockey Indoor Nations Championship III (2012 to 2016)

Championship IV

 Eurohockey Indoor Nations Challenge II (2010)

Women's results

Championship I

Medal summary

Division II

 Eurohockey Indoor Nations Trophy (1996 to 2010)

Division III

 Eurohockey Indoor Nations Challenge (1996 to 2010)
 Eurohockey Indoor Nations Championship III (2012 to 2014)

See also  
 EuroHockey Nations Championship
 Indoor Hockey World Cup

References

External links
 http://eurohockey.org/download/competitions-archive/ (All results)
 http://eurohockey.org/indoor-championships/ 
 http://eurohockey.org/competitions-archive-2/ 
 http://eurohockey.org/competitions-calendar/ 

 
European championships
EuroHockey Nations